Spraggs is an unincorporated village in Greene County, Pennsylvania, United States. Spraggs has a post office with ZIP code 15362, which opened on June 21, 1852. Also located there are an excavating company, a highway department substation, and a church between them, along with several houses.

References

Unincorporated communities in Greene County, Pennsylvania
Unincorporated communities in Pennsylvania